The 11th Pan American Games were held in Havana, Cuba from August 2 to August 18, 1991.

Medals

Silver

Men's Greco-Roman (– 52 kg): Ramón Mena

Results by event

Wrestleing

See also
 Panama at the 1992 Summer Olympics

Nations at the 1991 Pan American Games
1991 in Panamanian sport
1991